Joe Cinque's Consolation is a 2016 Australian drama film directed by Sotiris Dounoukos based on the book of the same name by Helen Garner. It concerns the increasingly fraught relationship between an engineer, Joe, and his narcissistic law student girlfriend Anu in Canberra in the mid 1990s. As Anu's mental state deteriorates, she conjures up a macabre plan to put an end to her suffering. The film was given a national cinema release in October 2016 and has received a generally positive response from critics.

Joe Cinque's Consolation was recognised at the 2016 AACTA Awards when Maggie Naouri was nominated in the category of Best Actress.

Plot
Anu Singh, an Australian National University student, drugged her boyfriend Joe Cinque's coffee with Rohypnol and injected him with heroin in 1997. The other guests of the dinner party in which this incident took place were aware of the murder plot and yet nobody warned him.

Cast
 Maggie Naouri as Anu Singh
 Jerome Meyer as Joe Cinque
 Sacha Joseph as Madhavi Rao
 Josh McConville as Chris
 Gia Carides as Maria Cinque
 Tony Nikolakopoulos as Nino Cinque
 Jacob Collins-Levy as Saul
 Laura Gordon as Tanya
 Jackson Tozer as Len Mancini
 Eva Lazzaro as Bronwyn
 Lara Schwerdt as Sarah

Production
The film was shot over a 6-week period, beginning in April 2015. Shooting took place around the city of Canberra. It received financial support from Screen Australia and the Australian Capital Territory Government. Screen Australia paid a $13,000 feature film development grant that was approved in May 2012. The ACT Government's contribution of $16,220, paid through the ACT Screen Arts Fund, was to assist with mentoring support for Dounoukos during key phases of the film's production.

Release
The film's world premiere was at the 2016 Melbourne International Film Festival, where the festival's Artistic Director Michelle Carey said "Seeing Joe Cinque's Consolation was one of the most visceral experiences I’ve had in a long time." It was also selected to be screened in the Discovery section at the 2016 Toronto International Film Festival. It was released nationally in cinemas across Australia on 13 October 2016. Joe Cinque's Consolation grossed $224,868 at the Australian box office, making it the tenth highest grossing Australian film of 2016. It was released on DVD and digital download in March 2017. The film premiered on Australian television on the Special Broadcasting Service (SBS) on Friday 20 October 2017.

Critical response
On Rotten Tomatoes the film has an approval rating of 75% based on reviews from 16 critics.

Reviewing the film for The Sydney Morning Herald, Paul Byrne wrote that it was intriguing in dramatic terms, "but not entirely satisfying". Reviewing for The Guardian, Luke Buckmaster gave the film 2 stars, describing it as an adaptation of the book as "one Herculean stretch" but also "level-headed, a sobering portrait of a tragedy intentionally bereft of narrative bells and whistles.". Academic Dirk de Bruyn found the film engaging and called it "mature and intelligent" and "riveting Australian cinema". Rochelle Siemienowicz praised elements of the film's cinematography and wrote that the mentality of the times was captured realistically, but lamented that dialogue delivered by Sacha Joseph as Madhavi Rao made the character seem robotic. Sandra Hall wrote that Joe Cinque is the only comprehensible character in the film, giving it three stars.

Richard Kuipers, writing for Variety in North America, gave a positive review: "[the film] offers a moody and compelling study of the facts while leaving audiences to draw their own conclusions to the burning question of why people would act like this". He went on to praise the performances by the two leads, as well as praising the technical details of the film, particularly the cinematography and score, stating: "Cinematographer Simon Chapman contrasts his warm lensing of intimate scenes with deliberately plain imagery of Canberra’s flat and uninteresting suburban landscape. Antonio Gambale's fine score slides nicely from bouncy rhythms in early, happy times to brooding soundscapes as Singh’s monstrous plan takes shape. All other tech work is solid."

Writing in The Hollywood News, Jazmine Sky Bradley gave the film four stars as "a gripping true crime drama not to miss". Richard Gray at The Reel Bits gave it 4½ stars and described it as "a complex love story, a plot for murder and an intense character study". Reviewing the film for the ABC, Jason Di Rosso found that "the film's unsettling power lies in the question it poses about active and passive responsibility" and called it "a dark and thought-provoking film that will linger with you long after the credits roll.”

Australian author Christos Tsiolkas praised the film in The Saturday Paper, writing that "the great strength of the film is in its quiet purposefulness", and that "though it pivots on a different set of questions to those that animate Garner’s book, they are both works of scrupulousness and integrity". Forensic psychiatrist Dr Russ Scott examined the legal and psychological aspects of the film in Psychiatry, Psychology and Law, praising the film's "prodigious research", "accomplished direction" and "strong performances" and concluding that "Joe Cinque’s Consolation, superbly acted and exquisitely nuanced, stands out as an example of Australian cinema at its very best."

Accolades
Maggie Naouri was nominated for Best Actress at the 6th AACTA Awards, but lost to Odessa Young for The Daughter.

References

External links
 

2016 films
2016 drama films
Australian drama films
Films set in Canberra
2010s English-language films